Dimitar Isakov (born 25 June 1924) is a Bulgarian retired football player. Isakov was a central forward.

Isakov was born in Dupnitsa. During his career, he played for PFC Marek Dupnitsa and PFC Slavia Sofia. He was the Bulgarian League's top goalscorer during the 1951–52 season, scoring 10 goals for Slavia. Isakov has 6 matches and 1 goal for Bulgaria national football team.

Awards
Slavia Sofia
 Bulgarian Cup: 1952
 A PFG top goalscorer: 1952 with 10 goals

References

1924 births
Living people
Bulgarian footballers
Association football forwards
PFC Marek Dupnitsa players
PFC Slavia Sofia players
First Professional Football League (Bulgaria) players
People from Dupnitsa
Sportspeople from Kyustendil Province